Biswambhar Bidyapitha is a co-educational Odia medium school located in Puri, Odisha, India. The school was established in the year 1945. There are 56 faculty members in the school. There is a library in the school with approximately 10,469 books. Mr.Sushil Kumar Brahma is the current Head Master of the school.

References 

Schools in Odisha
Puri
Educational institutions established in 1945
1945 establishments in India